Sir Derek Plumbly  (born 15 May 1948) is a British diplomat who has served throughout the Arab world. From 2012 to 2015, he served as the UN Special Coordinator for Lebanon.

Early life
Plumbly was born in the New Forest in Hampshire. He attended Brockenhurst Grammar School. He studied politics, philosophy and economics at Magdalen College, Oxford. After graduating, Plumbly signed up for Voluntary Service Overseas and taught for a year and a half in Sukkur in Pakistan's Sindh province.

Plumbly subsequently studied Arabic, first at the Middle East Centre for Arab Studies in Shemlan, Lebanon, where he lived with a local family for a year, and then at the University of Jordan.

Career
Plumbly has served in a variety of postings around the Middle East and elsewhere, including Ambassador to the Kingdom of Saudi Arabia and Ambassador to the Arab Republic of Egypt. In February 2008 he was appointed by Sudanese President Omar al-Bashir to head the Assessment and Evaluation Commission, charged with monitoring the implementation of Sudan's Comprehensive Peace Agreement.
In 2011, he was appointed as the United Nations Special Coordinator for Lebanon (UNSCOL); he served in this position from 2012 to 2015.

Since 2015, he is Visiting Professor of Middle Eastern Studies at King's College London.

Timeline of career
United Nations Special Coordinator for Lebanon (2012-2015) http://unscol.unmissions.org/
Chairman of the Assessment and Evaluation Commission (2008–2011)
Ambassador to Egypt (2003–2007)
Ambassador to Saudi Arabia (2000–2003)
FCO director for the Middle East and North Africa (1990s)
Deputy head of mission in Riyadh (1988–1992)
FCO Desk Officer for the Middle East Department (1982–1984)
First secretary in Cairo (1977–1980)
Second secretary in the Chancery at Jeddah (1975–1977)

See also
 Assessment and Evaluation Commission

Notes

References
 Curriculum Vitae of Sir Derek Plumbly.  Assessment and Evaluation Commission web site. Retrieved 7 July 2009.
 

1948 births
Alumni of Magdalen College, Oxford
Ambassadors of the United Kingdom to Egypt
Ambassadors of the United Kingdom to Saudi Arabia
Knights Commander of the Order of St Michael and St George
Living people
University of Jordan alumni
Members of HM Diplomatic Service
20th-century British diplomats